Pizzo Recastello is a mountain of Lombardy, Italy. It is located within the Bergamo Alps.

SOIUSA classification 

According to the SOIUSA (International Standardized Mountain Subdivision of the Alps) the mountain can be classified in the following way:
 main part = Eastern Alps
 major sector = Southern Limestone Alps
 section = Bergamasque Alps and Prealps
 subsection = Bergamo Alps
 supergroup = Alpi Orobie Orientali
 group = Gruppo di Coca
 subgroup = Gruppo del Barbellino
 code = II/C-29.I-A.2.a

References 

Mountains of Lombardy
Mountains of the Alps
Two-thousanders of Italy